Rhode Island had an at-large district with two seats, each of which were elected separately.

See also 
 Rhode Island's at-large congressional district special election, 1796
 United States House of Representatives elections, 1796 and 1797
 List of United States representatives from Rhode Island

1796
Rhode Island
United States House of Representatives